Tatul Tigrani Altunyan (Armenian: Թաթուլ Տիգրանի Ալթունյան; October 2 (15), 1901, Adana, Adana Vilayet, Ottoman Empire - November 29, 1973, Yerevan, Armenia) was an Armenian conductor, the founder of Armenian State Song-Dance Ensemble (currently named after him), People's Artist of USSR (1965), recipient of the State Prize of the USSR (1950) and university professor.

Altunyan was the student of Romanos Melikian and Spiridon Melikian. In 1934, after graduating from the Komitas State Conservatory of Yerevan, he studied at the Leningrad State Conservatory. Altunyan founded the Armenian National Song and Dance Ensemble in 1938, and acted as its principal conductor, giving performances around the world, until 1970. The ensemble is remembered as a "perfect illustration of the beauty of traditional Armenian music".

Altunyan died in 1973 and is buried at the Tokhmakh Cemetery in Yerevan, along with his wife Olga Altunyan. He is the father of conductor Zhirayr Altunyan, and composer Ruben Altunyan Karen Altunyan and Jilda Altunyan also .

References

External links
Biography (in Armenian)
TATUL ALTUNYAN’S ENSEMBLE 70 YEARS, Panorama.am, 2008

1901 births
1973 deaths
20th-century conductors (music)
People from Adana
People from Adana vilayet
Communist Party of the Soviet Union members
Saint Petersburg Conservatory alumni
People's Artists of Armenia
People's Artists of the USSR
Stalin Prize winners
Recipients of the Order of Lenin
Recipients of the Order of the Red Banner of Labour
Recipients of the Order of the Red Star
Armenians from the Ottoman Empire
Armenian conductors (music)
Emigrants from the Ottoman Empire to the Russian Empire